R310 road may refer to:
 R310 road (Ireland)
 R310 road (South Africa)